Randall Gregory Holcombe (born June 4, 1950) is an American economist, and the DeVoe Moore Professor of Economics at Florida State University. He is a Senior Fellow at The Independent Institute, a Senior Fellow and member of the Research Advisory Council at The James Madison Institute, and past president of the Public Choice Society. From 2000 to 2006 he served on Governor Jeb Bush's Council of Economic Advisors.

Holcombe is the author of several books on economics and American politics. In libertarian theoretical discourse, he has argued that private defense agencies could form cartels and oppress people, more or less as governments, with little fear of competition.

Holcombe is a musician and licensed pilot.

Bibliography
 
 Holcombe, Randall G. Political Capitalism: How Economic and Political Power is Made and Maintained. Cambridge University Press, 2018. .
 Holcombe, Randall G. Coordination, Cooperation, and Control: The Evolution of Economic and Political Power. Springer International Publishing, Cham 2020. , .

References

1950 births
Living people
American book editors
American economics writers
Economists from Florida
American essayists
21st-century American historians
21st-century American male writers
American libertarians
American philosophers
American political philosophers
Austrian School economists
Florida State University faculty
Historians of the United States
Libertarian historians
American male essayists
21st-century American economists
American male non-fiction writers